Colonia 18 de Julio is a caserío (hamlet) in the Salto Department of northwestern Uruguay.

Geography
The hamlet is located in the outskirts of the city of Salto.

Population
In 2011 Colonia 18 de Julio had a population of 750.
 
Source: Instituto Nacional de Estadística de Uruguay

References

External links
INE map of Colonia 18 de Julio

Populated places in the Salto Department